The Henderson Commercial District, in Henderson, Kentucky, was listed on the National Register of Historic Places in 1989.  The listing included 69 contributing buildings.

The district is roughly bounded by Main, Third, Elm, and First Streets.

References

Historic districts on the National Register of Historic Places in Kentucky
National Register of Historic Places in Henderson County, Kentucky
Italianate architecture in Kentucky
Romanesque Revival architecture in Kentucky
Neoclassical architecture in Kentucky
Buildings and structures completed in 1865
Commercial buildings on the National Register of Historic Places in Kentucky
Henderson, Kentucky